Charity Ann is a 1915 British silent drama film directed by Maurice Elvey and starring Elisabeth Risdon, Fred Groves and Chappell Dossett.

Cast
 Elisabeth Risdon as Ann Charity  
 Fred Groves as Graham Trevor 
 Chappell Dossett as Prof. Woolsey 
 Winifred Sadler

References

Bibliography
 Murphy, Robert. Directors in British and Irish Cinema: A Reference Companion. British Film Institute, 2006.

External links
 

1915 films
British drama films
British silent feature films
1910s English-language films
Films directed by Maurice Elvey
1915 drama films
Films set in England
British black-and-white films
1910s British films
Silent drama films